The Dodge T-Rex is a Ram-based concept vehicle produced by Dodge in 1997 with three axles and six-wheel drive.

It was powered by the 8.0-liter Magnum V10 engine, borrowed from the production 1990s era Ram 2500/3500 V-10. The heavy-duty Ram engine made 300 horsepower and 450-pound feet of torque. Power was never officially rated for the T-Rex, although dodgeram.org suggests more than stock.

Mercedes-Benz, which owned Chrysler at the time, later made a 6X6 version of the G63 AMG SUV/truck.

A version of the T-Rex was featured as an unlockable vehicle in the 2001 driving game Test Drive: Off-Road Wide Open, as well as the PS1 game Test Drive Off Road 3.

External links
 http://dodgeram.org/ki4cy/ram_picts/Trex.htm 
 http://www.fourwheeler.com/roadtests/129_9707_first_drive_dodge_ram_trex_6x6/index.html 

T-Rex